Pavel Konvička (born 25 March 1952) is a Czech rower. He competed at the 1972 Summer Olympics, 1976 Summer Olympics and the 1980 Summer Olympics.

References

1952 births
Living people
Czech male rowers
Olympic rowers of Czechoslovakia
Rowers at the 1972 Summer Olympics
Rowers at the 1976 Summer Olympics
Rowers at the 1980 Summer Olympics
Sportspeople from Olomouc